Brigadier Sir Henry Robert Kincaid Floyd, 5th Baronet,  (7 May 1899 – 5 November 1968) was a British soldier.

Personal life
Floyd was the son of Captain Sir Henry Robert Peel Floyd, 4th Baronet (a captain in the Royal Navy) and Edith Anne Kincaid-Smith. Floyd was the brother of Charles Murray Floyd.

Floyd married Kathleen Fanny Gretton (daughter of John Gretton) on 9 April 1922, with whom he had two daughters. A fervent supporter of horseriding and fox hunting, he was killed in a riding accident at the age of 69.

Military career
Floyd was educated at Eton College and at the Royal Military College, Sandhurst. He was an officer in the 15th/19th Hussars and, having been promoted to brigadier, during the Second World War he served as Brigadier General Staff (BGS) to VIII Corps, commanded by Lieutenant General Sir Richard O'Connor. He served with VIII Corps throughout Operation Overlord and was described as "a tower of strength to the new commander [O'Connor] and became a good friend as well". From October 1944 he was chief of staff of the Eighth Army, commanded by Lieutenant General Sir Richard McCreery, from 1944 to 1945.

Floyd served as Lord Lieutenant of Buckinghamshire from 1961 to 1968.

Legacy
The Sir Henry Floyd Grammar School in Aylesbury is named after him, as is part of the postgraduate medical centre at Stoke Mandeville Hospital.

References

Bibliography

|-

1899 births
1968 deaths
15th/19th The King's Royal Hussars officers
Baronets in the Baronetage of the United Kingdom
British Army brigadiers of World War II
British Army personnel of World War I
Commanders of the Order of the British Empire
Companions of the Order of the Bath
Deaths by horse-riding accident in England
Foreign recipients of the Legion of Merit
Graduates of the Royal Military College, Sandhurst
Lord-Lieutenants of Buckinghamshire
People educated at Eton College
People from Buckinghamshire